Devagiri is the largest village in Haveri Taluk of Haveri district in the Indian state of Karnataka. Local language is Kannada.

Total population of Devagiri is 8,826. Its sex ratio is 992 women for every 1000 men.

Etymology 

Although there are no clear answers to the derivation, the most popular belief is that the hill in the village upon which the village's major deity Girimalleshwara is placed is the reason for the name Devagiri, where Deva means deity and Giri means hill.

Notable people 

 Puttaraj Gawai was born here in 1914.

References 

Villages in Haveri district